Horacio Bernardo (born December 8, 1976) is an Uruguayan writer.

Works
 “Libres y Esclavos” (Free and Slaves). Ediciones La Gotera. 2005.
 “El hombre perdido” (The Lost Man). Grupo Planeta. 2007.

Philosophical works
"Un texto de Horacio Bernardo De la paradoja del «Todo Vale »", 1 July 2009
Filosophia en el Uruguay
 "De la paradoja en el "todo vale" de Paul Feyerabend a la falacia de la falsa libertad". Revista Galileo No. 28, páginas 65–73. Octubre de 2003.
 " De la paradoja en el "todo vale" de Paul Feyerabend a la falacia de la falsa libertad ". A parte rei. Universidad Autónoma de Madrid. 2003.
 "¿Qué es la vida?. Un problema epistemológico". A parte rei. Universidad Autónoma de Madrid. 2004.

See also
 List of Uruguayan writers

References

People from Montevideo
Uruguayan male writers
1976 births
Living people